Sérgio Daniel Sousa Silva (born 10 October 1996) known as Serginho, is a Portuguese footballer who plays for Gondomar on loan from UD Oliveirense as a forward.

Football career
On 9 December 2015, Serginho made his professional debut with Oliveirense in a 2015–16 Segunda Liga match against Feirense.

UD Oliveirense announced on 31 January 2019, that they had loaned out Serginho to Gondomar, so he could get some more playing time.

References

External links

Stats and profile at LPFP 

1996 births
Living people
Portuguese footballers
Association football forwards
Liga Portugal 2 players
U.D. Oliveirense players
Gondomar S.C. players